Brezovi Dol (in older sources also Brezov Dol) is a village east of Ambrus in the Municipality of Ivančna Gorica in central Slovenia. The area is part of the historical region of Lower Carniola and is now included in the Central Slovenia Statistical Region.

Name
The name Brezovi Dol literally means 'birch valley', derived from the common noun breza 'birch'. Like similar toponyms in Slovenia (e.g., Brezova, Brezovec, Brezovci), it originally referred to the local vegetation. The German name Birkenthal also means 'birch valley'.

History
During the Second World War, Italian forces burned a number of houses in the village in July 1942.

Cultural heritage

There is a chapel on the western outskirts of the village that incorporates a chapel-shrine dedicated to the Virgin Mary. It dates from the late 19th century.

References

External links

Brezovi Dol on Geopedia

Populated places in the Municipality of Ivančna Gorica